Sir David Carnegie of Pitarrow, 4th Baronet FRS FRSE (22 November 1753 – 25 May 1805) was a Scottish politician and (but for the attainder of the 5th Earl) 7th Earl of Southesk, 7th Baron Carnegie of Kinnaird and 7th Baron Carnegie, of Kinnaird and Leuchars.

Background
He was born in Kincardineshire the oldest son of Sir James Carnegie, 3rd Baronet and his wife Christian Doig (d.1820), daughter of David Doig. In 1765, aged only twelve, Carnegie succeeded his father as baronet and as claimant to the Earldom of Southesk. He was educated at Eton College, the University of St Andrews and Christ Church, Oxford.

Career
Carnegie entered the British House of Commons as Member of Parliament (MP) for Aberdeen Burghs in 1784, sitting for the constituency until 1790. He then represented Forfarshire in the Parliament of Great Britain from 1796 until the Act of Union in 1801, then subsequently in the Parliament of the United Kingdom until his death in 1805. Carnegie was Deputy Governor of the British Linen Company. He partly rebuild and improved Kinnaird Castle, Brechin, the family's ancestral seat.

Family
On 23 April 1783, he married Agnes Murray Elliot, daughter of Andrew Elliot, at Edinburgh and had by her ten daughters and two sons. Carnegie died at Gloucester Place in London and was buried at St Martin-in-the-Fields. He was succeeded in his titles by his older son James.

References

External links

1753 births
1805 deaths
Alumni of Christ Church, Oxford
Alumni of the University of St Andrews
Baronets in the Baronetage of Nova Scotia
British MPs 1784–1790
British MPs 1790–1796
British MPs 1796–1800
Members of the Parliament of Great Britain for Scottish constituencies
Members of the Parliament of the United Kingdom for Scottish constituencies
People educated at Eton College
UK MPs 1801–1802
UK MPs 1802–1806
Fellows of the Royal Society